Brijesh Sharmari "BJ" Lawrence (born 27 December 1989) is a Saint Kitts and Nevis sprinter who specialises in the 100 metres. He won a bronze medal in the 4 × 100 m relay at the 2011 World Championships.

He studied at Doane College in Crete, Nebraska.

Personal bests

International competitions

References

External links

Tilastopaja biography

1989 births
Living people
Saint Kitts and Nevis male sprinters
People from Basseterre
Pan American Games silver medalists for Saint Kitts and Nevis
Pan American Games medalists in athletics (track and field)
Athletes (track and field) at the 2011 Pan American Games
Athletes (track and field) at the 2012 Summer Olympics
Athletes (track and field) at the 2016 Summer Olympics
Olympic athletes of Saint Kitts and Nevis
World Athletics Championships medalists
Athletes (track and field) at the 2010 Commonwealth Games
Athletes (track and field) at the 2014 Commonwealth Games
Commonwealth Games competitors for Saint Kitts and Nevis
Athletes (track and field) at the 2015 Pan American Games
World Athletics Championships athletes for Saint Kitts and Nevis
Medalists at the 2011 Pan American Games